Dave Duncan (born July 15, 1982 in London, Ontario) is a World Cup freestyle skier. Duncan is currently a member of the Canadian National Ski Cross Team.

Career
Duncan had a successful and breakout season during the 2009–10 Freestyle Skiing World Cup. Duncan earned his first career World Cup top ten finish, placing 9th at the World Cup in Branaes, Sweden. David Duncan needed to finish 5th or better at the January 24, Lake Placid ski-cross event to qualify for the Olympics. In the final Duncan won bronze thereby qualifying him for the 2010 Winter Olympics in Vancouver. Alongside his bronze at Lake Placid Duncan also won a bronze medal in St. Johann in Tirol/Oberndorf, Austria on January 5.

Besides being a freestyle skier David Duncan is an aspiring helicopter pilot, Duncan also graduated from the University of Alaska after four years of schooling. He is sponsored by Stoeckli, POC, Osisko,  Boler MTN and Mount 7 Lodges.

During a training run at the 2010 Winter Olympics, Dave broke his collarbone and therefore was not able to compete.  Taking his place was supposed to be Brady Leman of Calgary, Alberta. However, Leman aggravated a broken tibia he suffered the previous year and was also unable to compete.  Replacing both of them was Davey Barr of Brackendale, British Columbia.

Duncan competed for Canada at the 2018 Winter Olympics in Pyeongchang and finished eighth in ski cross. On February 24, he, along with his wife Maja and technical ski coach Willy Raine, were arrested in Pyeongchang for stealing a car while under the influence on their way back to the Olympic Village. They were later released and fined for the incident and were not allowed to participate in the closing ceremony.

Notable results
–1st - World Cup, Innichen, ITA (21/12/2013)

–1st - World Cup, Innichen, ITA (22/12/2013)

–1st - Canadian National Championships, Canada Olympic Park, CAN (23/03/2009)

–2nd - World Cup, Bischofsweisen/Goetschen, GER (26/2/2012)

–3rd - World Cup, Val Thorens, FRA (17/1/2014)

–4th - World Cup, Innichen, ITA (22/12/2016)

–6th - World Cup, Arosa, SUI (12/12/2017)

–8th - 2018 Winter Olympics, Pyeongchang, KOR (21/2/2018)

References

External links
 
 
 Ski Cross Canada 
 

1982 births
Canadian male freestyle skiers
Freestyle skiers at the 2014 Winter Olympics
Freestyle skiers at the 2018 Winter Olympics
Living people
Olympic freestyle skiers of Canada
Sportspeople from London, Ontario

X Games athletes